Ryan White (born March 17, 1988) is a Canadian former professional ice hockey center who last played for the Wichita Thunder of the ECHL. He previously played in the National Hockey League (NHL) for the Montreal Canadiens, Philadelphia Flyers, Arizona Coyotes and Minnesota Wild. He is the current assistant coach of the Winkler Flyers of the Manitoba Junior Hockey League.

Playing career
White grew up playing in the Brandon minor hockey system before graduating to the AAA midget level. In his first and only year of AAA, White led his Wheat Kings team to a gold medal at the 2004 Telus Cup.

White spent four seasons, from 2004–05 to 2007–08, in the Western Hockey League with the Calgary Hitmen.  He was drafted by the Montreal Canadiens in the third round, 66th overall, in the 2006 NHL Entry Draft. Following his WHL career, White was assigned to the Canadiens' minor league affiliate, the Hamilton Bulldogs of the American Hockey League (AHL), where he recorded 29 points in 80 games as a rookie in 2008–09.

White made his NHL debut in a call-up to the Montreal Canadiens on November 5, 2009 against the Boston Bruins, recording an assist. He was called up once again for a game against the Ottawa Senators the following month on December 8.  After playing in the first period of that game, he was pulled from the game after the NHL noticed he was playing, despite the Canadiens not having properly reported his call-up to the league before the 5 p.m. deadline.

White scored his first NHL goal as part of a Gordie Howe hat trick during a game against the Minnesota Wild on March 20, 2011.

On August 7, 2014, having left the Canadiens organization as a free agent, White signed a one-year, two-way contract with the Philadelphia Flyers.

On July 1, 2016, White signed as a free agent to a one-year deal with the Arizona Coyotes. Adding a physical presence in a depth role to the Coyotes, White added 7 goals and 13 points in 46 games during the 2016–17 season, before he was traded alongside Martin Hanzal and a fourth-round pick in 2017, to the Minnesota Wild in exchange for a 1st-round pick in 2017, 2nd-round pick in 2018, conditional 4th-round pick in 2019, and Grayson Downing on February 26, 2017.

On August 29, 2017, the Vancouver Canucks signed White to a PTO in order to attend training camp. However, on October 7, he was released by the Canucks. With the 2017–18 season underway, White signed a professional tryout contract with the Boston Bruins on October 10. After practicing and travelling with the Bruins for nearly a month, White and the Bruins agreed on a mutual release from his PTO on November 6.

On November 17, 2017, White secured an initial PTO contract with the San Diego Gulls of the AHL, affiliate to the Anaheim Ducks.  White appeared in 21 games with the Gulls for 9 points before he was released from his PTO on February 8, 2018. The following day, White was signed to the Iowa Wild on a Standard Player Contract (SPC), marking a return of sorts within the Minnesota Wild organization. He completed the season with Iowa, finishing with 2 goals and 8 points in 23 games.

Remaining as an unsigned free agent into the 2018–19 season, White again continued his professional career in the AHL, securing a professional try-out contract with home province club, the Manitoba Moose, on October 27, 2018.

Approaching the 2019–20 season, White as an unsigned free agent returned to the Manitoba Moose, attending training camp. On October 4, 2019, he was signed to a professional tryout contract in making the opening night roster.

After beginning the 2020–21 season with the Boissevain Border Kings of the Tiger Hills Hockey League (THHL), White signed with the Wichita Thunder of the ECHL on March 30, 2021. He made his debut with the Thunder the following day, April 1.

Personal life

After retiring from playing professional hockey White became assistant coach of the Winkler Flyers of the Manitoba Junior Hockey League. In February, 2022 his son Gordie was diagnosed with diffuse intrinsic pontine glioma, a rare and difficult to treat cancer. A GoFundMe page raised more than $200,000 for his treatment.

Career statistics

Awards and honours

References

External links

 

1988 births
Arizona Coyotes players
Calgary Hitmen players
Canadian ice hockey centres
Hamilton Bulldogs (AHL) players
Ice hockey people from Manitoba
Iowa Wild players
Lehigh Valley Phantoms players
Living people
Manitoba Moose players
Minnesota Wild players
Montreal Canadiens draft picks
Montreal Canadiens players
Philadelphia Flyers players
San Diego Gulls (AHL) players
Sportspeople from Brandon, Manitoba
Wichita Thunder players